Puzzlehead is a science fiction drama film starring Stephen Galaida, Robbie Shapiro, and Mark Janis. It was written and directed by James Bai and the film debuted at the Tribeca Film Festival on April 21, 2005 before opening in limited release in New York City on March 23, 2006.

Plot 
Walter, a scientist living in a dark world where technology has been outlawed, secretly works to create a self-aware android in his own likeness. This android, named Puzzlehead by Walter, acts as the scientist's companion and his connection to the outside world; all the time developing his own personality and self-awareness in the manner of a learning child. The android and his maker turn against one another when Puzzlehead pursues Julia, a woman who does not know Walter has feelings for her.

Awards and nominations
 Won the Jury Award for Best Special Effects at the Austin Fantastic Festival.

Cast 
 Stephen Galaida - Puzzlehead/Walter
 Robbie Shapiro - Julia
 Jon Bavier

Filming locations 
 Brooklyn, New York

Reception
The film has a 100% rating on Rotten Tomatoes based on 7 reviews.

References

External links 
 
 
 

2005 films
2005 science fiction films
American robot films
2000s English-language films
2000s American films